Tom Hamilton (born August 19, 1954) is an American sportscaster, primarily known as the chief radio play-by-play announcer for the Cleveland Guardians Major League Baseball team.

Hamilton joined the Guardians Radio Network for the 1990 season, after spending three years in the booth for the then AAA affiliate of the New York Yankees, the Columbus Clippers. He was paired with Indians legend Herb Score until 1997, when Score retired after 30 seasons. Hamilton became chief play by play announcer in the 1998 season, a position he still holds today. Because of his longevity and popularity, he is now considered to be the "voice of the Tribe". After the Indians were renamed to the Guardians, he has also been referred to as the "voice of the Guardians".

Until recently, Hamilton called college basketball games in the offseason (usually Ohio State games) for ESPN Plus, and Big Ten Network.

Broadcasting associates with the Indians/Guardians
Herb Score, 1990–1997
Mike Hegan, 1998–2011
Dave Nelson, 1998-1999*
Matt Underwood, 2000-2006*
Jim Rosenhaus, 2010–present*

(*) - Nelson, and later Underwood joined Hamilton and Hegan in a three-man booth from 1998 to 2007, when the Indians then went to a two-man booth. Rosenhaus, Hamilton and Hegan formed a three-man team for the 2010 and 2011 seasons.

Broadcasting credits
(all pre-Indians/Guardians)
University of Wisconsin–Madison—football games
ABC Radio
Appleton Foxes—minor league baseball games
University of Colorado—basketball games
Columbus Clippers—minor league baseball games

Signature calls
 "And we're underway at the corner of Carnegie and Ontario!" - after the first pitch of a Guardians home game (during away games, Hamilton will usually say "And we're underway at [opposing team's ballpark or city]")
 "Juuust a bit [outside/inside]" - when a close pitch by a pitcher is called for a ball
 "The string is out." - for a full count
 "STRIKE THREE CALLED!" - after a Guardians pitcher strikes out an opposing batter looking
 "Swing and a drive, waaaay back, and gone!!" or "Swung on and belted, to deep __ (left/center/right), awaaaay back, and outta here!!" - for a Guardians home run
 "And a mobbing at home plate!" or "He's about to get mobbed!" - after a Guardians walk-off home run
 "Swiiiing and a miss, he tried to hit that one to Euclid / into Lake Erie." - when a batter swings really hard but misses (for away games, Hamilton will use the name of a nearby suburb or neighborhood in the home city)
 "And [batter's name] has left a small village on base tonight." - when a lot of runners have been stranded on-base
 "Oh, what a job by [name of Guardians pitcher]!" - when a Guardians pitcher dominates the opposing lineup or gets out of a jam
 "A SWING and a miss!" - for a swinging strikeout by a Guardians pitcher
 "Mm mm mm" - after a Guardians error
 "Oh, for the love of Pete!" - in exasperation
 "How about that!" - after something unusual or exciting happens
 "Ballgame!" - after the final out of a Guardians win
 "So long, everybody" - signature sign-off

Personal life
Hamilton resides in Avon Lake, Ohio, with his wife and four children. One son (Nick) was drafted by the Cleveland Indians in the 35th round in the 2012 MLB Draft out of Kent State University.

Another son - Brad - works as a reporter for Cleveland Fox affiliate WJW-TV 8.

Books
Glory Days in Tribe Town: The Cleveland Indians and Jacobs Field 1994–1997, (Co-Written with Terry Pluto), 2014

Awards and honors
Seven-time NSSA Ohio Sportscaster of the Year (1997, 2000, 2001, 2004, 2006, 2013, 2017) 
2009 inductee - Cleveland Association of Broadcasters Hall of Fame
 2015 Lifetime Achievement Award - Greater Cleveland Sports Awards
Greater Cleveland Sports Hall of Fame (class of 2022)

References

External links
Cleveland Guardians: Broadcasters

American radio sports announcers
American television sports announcers
Cleveland Guardians announcers
College basketball announcers in the United States
Living people
Major League Baseball broadcasters
Minor League Baseball broadcasters
People from Avon Lake, Ohio
Wisconsin Badgers football announcers
1954 births